The South African Railways and Harbours Service Act, 1912 made striking by railway employees punishable by fine or imprisonment.

References

1912 in South African law